Daniel Baul (born 14 February 1996) is a Papua New Guinean track and field athlete, mainly sprinter. He won a gold medal in the men's 4 × 400 m relay at 2019 Pacific Games in Apia. 

Baul wil compete in the Men's 4 × 400 m relay and the 400 m hurdles at the 2022 Commonwealth Games in Birmingham, England.

References

External links 
Daniel Baul at World Athletics

1996 births
Living people
Papua New Guinean male sprinters